Pultenaea grayi, commonly known as Murrumbidgee bossiaea, is a species of flowering plant in the family Fabaceae and is endemic to the Australian Capital Territory. It is an erect shrub with flattened, winged, glabrous cladodes, leaves reduced to small scales, and pea-like, yellow and red flowers.

Description
There are also bracteoles but that fall off before the flower opens.

Taxonomy and naming
Bossiaea grayi was first formally described in 2009 by Keith Leonard McDougall in the journal Telopea from specimens collected near the Murrumbidgee River, downstream from the Kambah Pool in 1980. The specific epithet (grayi) honours the retired taxonomist Max Gray.

Distribution and habitat
Murrumbidgee bossiaea grows in woodland on the banks of the Murrumbidgee River and its tributaries in the Australian Capital Territory.

Conservation status
Bossiaea grayi is listed as "endangered" under the Australian Capital Territory Government Nature Conservation Act 2014.

References

grayi
Flora of the Australian Capital Territory
Plants described in 2009